Gulliver is a surname and masculine given name. It may refer to:

As a surname
Ashbel Green Gulliver (1897–1974), dean of Yale Law School from 1940 to 1946
Ben Gulliver (born 1981), English former rugby union player
Charles Gulliver, British music-hall producer and impresario in the early 20th century
Dorothy Gulliver (1908–1997), American film actress
George Gulliver (1804–1882), English anatomist and physiologist
Glenn Gulliver (born 1954), American former Major League Baseball player
Henrietta Maria Gulliver (1866–1945), Australian painter
Isaac Gulliver (1745–1822), English smuggler
James Gulliver (1930–1996), founder of Argyll Foods
Julia Gulliver (1856–1940), American philosopher, educator and college president
Kenneth Gulliver (1913–2001), Australian cricketer
Phil Gulliver (born 1982), English footballer
Richard Gulliver (born 1942), English former cricketer
Stuart Gulliver (born 1959), British banking business executive
Trina Gulliver (born 1969), English darts player

Fictional
Lemuel Gulliver, the protagonist of the novel Gulliver's Travels

As a given name
Gulliver McGrath (born 1998), Australian actor
Gulliver Ralston (born 1978), British musician

Fictional
Gulliver, a Seagull character from the video game series Animal Crossing

See also
Grgo Kusić (1892–1918), Croat soldier in the Austro-Hungarian Army nicknamed the "Gulliver of Dalmatia"
Gulliver (disambiguation)

Masculine given names
English-language surnames
English masculine given names